Peter B. Evans (born 1944) is an American academic. He is a Faculty Fellow in International and Public Affairs at the Watson Institute for International and Public Affairs at Brown University and Professor of Sociology emeritus at the University of California, Berkeley.

Evans received his BA magna cum laude from Harvard University, an MA from Oxford University, and an MA and PhD from Harvard. He is a political sociologist whose work focuses on the comparative political economy of development and globalization. He has published widely on state-society relations, industrial economic development in Brazil and Latin America, civil society, and international development issues. His work is thus also relevant to the international political economy research literature.

Evans is active in the American Sociological Association's section on Labor and Labor Movements and has served as chair of that section.  He is also a board member of the United Nations Research Institute for Social Development.

In the year 2000 Evans co-founded The Other Canon, a center and network for heterodox economics research, with - amongst others - Erik Reinert, executive chairman and main founder.

Evans has taught at Oxford University, Brown University, the University of New Mexico, Universidade de Brasília, and Kivukoni College in Tanzania, In recent years, he has focused his attention on the study of alternative, and counterhegemonic globalization movements.

Selected publications
Population, Health and Development: An Institutional-Cultural Approiach to Capability Expansion. In Peter B. Halland Michele Lamont (eds.) Successful Societies: How Institutions and Culture Affect Health Cambridge University Press, 2009.
Is an Alternative Globalization Possible? Politics & Society, 2008, 36(2)The Challenges of the 'Institutional Turn': Interdisciplinary Opportunities in Development Theory. In Victor Nee and Richard Swedberg (eds.) The Economic Sociology of Capitalist Institutions Princeton, NJ: Princeton University Press, 2005.
Building ridges across a double divide: Alliances between U.S. and Latin American labor and NGOs (with M. Anner), Development in Practice, 2004, 14(1-2), 34–47.
Collective capabilities, culture and Amartya Sen's development of freedom, Studies in Comparative International Development, 2002, 37(2), 54-60.
Dependent Development: The Alliance of Multinational, State, and Local Capital in Brazil (1979) Translated into Portuguese, 1980.
Embedded Autonomy: States and industrial Transformation (1995)
Counterhegemonic Globalization: Transnational Social Movements in the Contemporary Global Political Economy. In Handbook of Political Sociology (2005)
Bringing the State Back In, edited with Dietrich Rueschemeyer and Theda Skocpol. (1985)
States Versus Markets in the World-System, edited with Dietrich Rueschemeyer and Evelyne Huber Stephens. (1985)
High Technology and Third World Industrialization: Brazilian Computer Policy in Comparative Perspective, edited with Claudio R. Frischtak and Paulo Bastos Tigre. (1992)
Double-Edged Diplomacy: International Bargaining and Domestic Politics, edited with Harold K. Jacobson and Robert Putnam. (1993)
Sunbelt Working Mothers: Reconciling Family and Factory by Louise Lamphere, Patricia Zavella, Felipe Gonzales ; with Peter B. Evans. (1993)
State-Society Synergy: Government and Social Capital in Development (1997)
Livable Cities?: Urban Struggles for Livelihood and Sustainability (2002)

References

External links
 http://sociology.berkeley.edu/professor-emeritus/peter-evans

American sociologists
American political scientists
1944 births
Living people
Brazilianists
Harvard University alumni
Alumni of the University of Oxford
Brown University fellows
University of California, Berkeley faculty